Rewired is the only Belgian annual demoparty, which is organised since 2008. Typical competitions include PC demos and intros, hand-made and ray traced graphics, "wild", music and "oldskool" competitions. 

The first three editions took place in Maaseik, Belgium. The party is organized in JC Fuego, not far from downtown Maaseik.

In 2011, the party went on a break but returned in 2012, moving the party to Godsheide near Hasselt, Belgium.

Previous editions 
 Rewired 2008: "Real party is outside Germany"
 Rewired 2009: "Summer is here"
 Rewired 2010: "Next Christmas arrives next Summer"
 Rewired 2012
 Rewired 2013: "The Garden Edition"
 Rewired 2014: "The Second Garden Edition"

Upcoming editions 
Currently there are no further events planned.

External links
 Rewired demoparties results, reports and productions download on Pouët
 Rewired homepage
 Rewired on Demozoo

Demo parties
Competitions in Belgium